Outlying Islands is a 2002 drama play written by Scottish playwright David Greig. While all the events and characters in the play are works of fiction, it was inspired by Robert Atkinson's book Island Going.

Synopsis
Set on a remote Scottish island in the summer of 1939, two ornithologistsyoung, impulsive and English Robert and the more-conservative-yet naive Scottish Johnare sent to catalogue the bird colonies on the island. Together with the stern lease-holder of the island, Mr Kirk, and his young niece Ellen, they are the only inhabitants for the summer.

The play ruthlessly uncovers the motivations of its characters, resulting in a painful triangle between John, Robert and Ellen. It is about nature versus technology, old versus new, with the threat of the coming world war looming over it all.

Production History
The play was first published and performed in 2002 and won a Fringe First award and a Herald Angel award after its premiere at the Traverse Theatre in Edinburgh, Scotland, during the Edinburgh Festival Fringe. It was revived at the Traverse in October 2014.

The play was performed by Sugarglass Theatre at the Connelly Theatre in New York in 2016 and later revived at the Samuel Beckett Theatre in Dublin in August 2017.

The play was revived in January 2019 by Atticist at the King's Head Theatre in London. It received an Off West nomination for Best Production.

Casting History

See also

 2002 in literature
 Scottish literature

References

External links 
  The book on Faber and Faber's website
  A review of the 2004 American premiere in the Pittsburgh Post-Gazette
 

Fiction set in 1939 
2002 plays
English-language plays
Ornithology in the United Kingdom
Plays set in Scotland
Scottish plays